Zélie may refer to:

People 

 Zélie de Lussan, French-American opera singer
 Zelie Emerson, American suffragette in England 
 Zélie Lardé, Salvadoran painter
 Louis Martin and Marie-Azélie Guérin, Roman Catholic saints

Other uses 

 Zélie (given name)